Robert Miller is an American music composer for film, television and concert hall. Over the years he has earned seven Clio Awards,  two AICP Awards,  two Emmy "group" nominations for the Coca-Cola spot “It’s Mine” as well as collective Emmys for Coca-Cola's “Heist". In 2016, Miller received an Emmy nomination for Outstanding Music Interpretation for the film "Of Miracles and Men".

Career

Film scoring 
Miller's film scoring career ranges across documentaries, thrillers, dramas, and comedies. Some notable films include:
 Why We Fight
 Teeth
 Anytown, USA
 Happy Tears
 The House I Live In
 Particle Fever
 You Get Me
 Celtics/Lakers: Best of Enemies
 Atomic Homefront
 Excuse Me for Living
 The Forgotten Kingdom
 Future '38
 I Love You, Daddy
 THE KING
 Knife Skills

Commercial scoring 
Miller has scored commercials for Coca-Cola, Mercedes, GE, Pedigree, BMW, Gillette, Toyota, Budweiser, PlayStation, Travelers, SAP, UPMC, Levi's, and many more.

References

Year of birth missing (living people)
Place of birth missing (living people)
Living people
American film score composers
21st-century American composers
20th-century American composers
Clio Award winners